The Nokia 5200 is a Series 40 mobile phone manufactured by Nokia. Announced on 27 September 2006, it is less featured than its better counterpart, the Nokia 5300, and is not XpressMusic branded. It got its last software update in 2008.

5200 and 5300 differences
The 5300 is very similar in appearance to the 5200. Some of the main differences between the two phones are:
 The 5300 has a larger screen with higher resolution and higher quality: 240×320 versus 128×160.
 A higher resolution (1.3 megapixel) camera is included on the 5300 than the 5200 (VGA).
 The 5300 has more music controls on the side of the phone.

Features

References

External links 
 Nokia 5200 Technical specifications 
 Nokia 5200 at Nokia Europe 

5200
Mobile phones with infrared transmitter
Mobile phones introduced in 2006
Slider phones